Pınar Kür (born April 15, 1943) is a Turkish author and dramatist. She currently teaches at Istanbul Bilgi University.

Pınar Kür is the daughter of İsmet Kür (1916–2013), who was an educator, journalist, columnist and writer of mainly children's literature. Her maternal aunt Halide Nusret Zorlutuna (1901–1984) was a poet.

Works 
Yarın Yarın (1976)
Küçük Oyuncu (1977)
Asılacak Kadın (1979)
Akışı Olmayan Sular (1983)
Bitmeyen Aşk (1986)
Bir Cinayet Romanı (1989)
Sonuncu Sonbahar (1992)
Bir Deli Ağaç (1992)
Hayalet Hikâyeleri (2004)

Translations 

 Theo'ya Mektuplar / Vincent van Gogh (Yapı Kredi Yayınları, 1996) ISBN 978-975-363-551-6
 Vişnenin Cinsiyeti - Jeanette Wİnterson - (Sexing the Cherry)
 Bağla Şu İşi
 Aç Sınıfın Laneti
 Ademden Önce - Jack London
 Tutku - Jeanette Winterson ( The Passion)
 Yabancı Kucak - Ian McEwan (The Comfort of Strangers)
 Geniş Geniş Bir Deniz - Jean Rhys - (Wide Sargasso Sea)
 Dalda Duran Kuşlar - Jean Rhys - (Öykülerinden seçmeler)
 Günaydın Geceyarısı - Jean Rhys - Goodmorning Midnight
 Karanlıkta Yolculuk - Jean Rhys - (Voyage in the Dark)
 Dörtlü - Jean Rhys - (Quartet)
 Karamlıkta Kahkaha - Vladimir Nobakov - (Laughter in the Dark)
 Şaklaban - Morris West
 Ailenin Laneti - Dashiel Hammet
 Yunus İnsanlar - Tırsten Krol
 Doğmamış Çocuğa Mektup
 Durulmayan Bir Kafa - Kay Redfield Jamison

References

Living people
Turkish non-fiction writers
Turkish scientists
Turkish literary critics
Boğaziçi University alumni
Alumni of Arnavutköy American High School for Girls
1943 births